This is a list of commercial banks in the Republic of the Congo

 Afriland First Bank
 Banque Commerciale Internationale (BCI)
 BGFIBank Congo (BGFI)
 Bank Congolaise de l'Habitat (BCH)
 Crédit du Congo (CDC) - A subsidiary of Attijariwafa Bank of Morocco
 Ecobank
 La Congolaise de Banque (LCB)
 Bangue Postale du Congo (BPC)

External links
 Website of Central Bank of Central African States

See also
 List of banks in Africa
 Central Bank of Central African States
 List of companies based in the Republic of the Congo

References

Banks
Congo, Republic of the
 
Congo, Republic of the